The University of the Republic of San Marino (in Italian: Università degli Studi della Repubblica di San Marino) is a university based in the Republic of San Marino. It was created in 1985, but it started its activities with the Scuola Superiore di Studi Storici.

Organization
Following the academic reorganization which took place in 2014 after the approval the same year of new framework legislation on academic education in San Marino, the university has been divided in 3 departments:
Department of Economics, Sciences and Law
Department of Human Sciences
Department of History and of Sanmarinese Culture and History

Previously, there were 6 departments:
Department of Biomedical Studies
Department of Communication 
Department of Education and Training
Department of Economics and Technology
Department of Historical Studies (composed of the Scuola Superiore di Studi Storici and the Centro di Studi Storici)
Department of Law Studies

Its library has more than 30,000 books.

Academic profile

Undergraduate courses
The university offers four undergraduate programmes:
 Civil Engineering (in association with the University of Modena and Reggio Emilia)
 Engineering Management (in association with the University of Parma)
 Design (in association with the University of Bologna)
 Chartered Building Surveyor program (in association with the University of Modena and Reggio Emilia)
 Communication and Digital Media program (in association with the University of Bologna)

Postgraduate courses
The university offers a number of postgraduate courses, most of which in collaboration with other universities:

Laurea magistrale
Civil Engineering (in association with the University of Modena and Reggio Emilia)
Engineering Management (in association with the University of Parma)
Design
Master
Aesthetic Medicine (in association with the University of Perugia)
Aesthetic Surgery (in association with the University of Perugia)
Communication, Management and New Media (in association with the IUAV University of Venice)
Criminology and Forensic Psychiatry (in association with the University of Urbino)
Geriatric Medicine (in association with the University of Ferrara)
Learning Disabilities (in association with the University of Modena and Reggio Emilia and the University of Urbino)
Strategy and Planning of Sports Events and Complexes (in association with the University of Parma)
PhD
Historical Sciences

Research Centres

The university hosts the Research Centre for International Relations.

Notable people

Luciano Canfora, classicist and historian, scientific coordinator of the Scuola Superiore di Studi Storici di San Marino since 1999
Michele Chiaruzzi, historian and diplomat, ambassador of San Marino in Sarajevo
Roberto Gualtieri, Mayor of Rome, former Minister of Economy and Finances of Italy, and former Chair of the Economic and Monetary Affairs Committee of the European Parliament.
Jan Krzysztof Olendzki, politician and diplomat, former Polish minister of Culture and former Poland's ambassador to Tunisia
Nicola Renzi, former Secretary of State for Foreign Affairs of San Marino 
Renato Zangheri, historian and politician, mayor of Bologna (1970-1983) and MP (1983-1992), rector of the university (1991-1994)

See also
 List of universities in San Marino

References

External links
University of the Republic of San Marino

Universities in San Marino
Educational institutions established in 1985
1985 establishments in San Marino